The Poko are a people of Transvaal, South Africa. They were conquered in 1864 by the Boer settlers and Mswati II.

References

Ethnic groups in South Africa